This article lists the alumni chapters of the Sigma Chi Fraternity in alphabetical order by state with international chapters following. Some chapters listed are no longer active in the fraternity and are italicized.

For undergraduate chapters, see List of Sigma Chi chapters.

Alumni Chapters in the United States

Alabama 
Birmingham Alumni Chapter
Mobile Alumni Chapter
North Alabama Alumni Chapter

Alaska
Anchorage Alumni Chapter

Arizona
Green Valley Alumni Chapter
Phoenix Alumni Chapter
Prescott Alumni Chapter

Arkansas 
Central Arkansas Alumni Chapter
Northeast Arkansas Alumni Chapter
Northwest Arkansas Alumni Chapter

California
Fresno Alumni Chapter
L.A. County Alumni Chapter
Monterey Bay Alumni Chapter
Napa-Sonoma Alumni Chapter
Oakland East Bay Alumni Chapter
Orange County Alumni Chapter
Peninsula-San Mateo Alumni Chapter
California Capital Region Alumni Chapter
San Diego Alumni Chapter
San Fernando Valley Alumni Association
San Francisco Alumni Association
San Jose Alumni Chapter
Santa Barbara Alumni Association

Colorado
Denver Alumni Chapter
Pike's Peak Region Alumni Association

Connecticut
Greater Fairfield County Alumni Chapter 
Hartford Alumni Chapter
New Haven Alumni Chapter

District of Columbia

Capital City Alumni Chapter (inactive)
Washington Alumni Chapter

Florida
Central Florida Alumni Chapter
Fort Myers/Lee County Alumni Association
Ft. Lauderdale Alumni Chapter
Jacksonville Alumni Chapter
Lakeland Alumni Chapter
Greater Miami Alumni Chapter
Naples Alumni Chapter
North Florida Alumni Association
Palm Beach Alumni Chapter
Sarasota Area Sigma Chi Alumni Chapter
Tampa Bay Alumni Chapter
Western Florida Alumni Association

Georgia
Atlanta Alumni Chapter    
Chattahoochee Valley Area Alumni Chapter    
Statesboro Alumni Chapter

Hawaii
Honolulu Alumni Chapter

Idaho
Boise Alumni Chapter

Illinois
Chicago DuPage Alumni Chapter    
Chicago Metro Alumni Chapter    
Chicago North Shore Alumni Chapter    
Chicago Northwest Suburban Alumni Chapter    
Lincoln Park Alumni Chapter    
Peoria Alumni Chapter

Indiana
Indianapolis Alumni Chapter     
Northwest Indiana Alumni Chapter    
Plymouth Alumni Chapte
Valparaiso University

Iowa
Central Iowa Alumni Association    
Iowa City-Cedar Rapids Alumni Chapter

Kansas
Johnson County Area Alumni Chapter    
Kansas City Alumni Chapter    
Manhattan Alumni Chapter

Kentucky
Louisville Alumni Chapter
Central Ky Alumni Chapter

Louisiana
Baton Rouge Alumni Association    
New Orleans Alumni Chapter    
Shreveport Alumni Chapter

Maine
Southern Maine Alumni Association

Maryland
Baltimore Alumni Chapter (inactive)
College Park Alumni Chapter

Massachusetts
Boston Alumni Chapter

Michigan
Grand Rapids Alumni Chapter    
Kalamazoo Alumni Chapter

Minnesota
Minneapolis Alumni Chapter    
Southern Minnesota Alumni Chapter

Mississippi
Mississippi Gulf Coast Alumni Chapter    
Tupelo Alumni Chapter

Missouri
Central Missouri Alumni Chapter    
Kansas City Alumni Chapter    
Southeast Missouri Alumni Chapter    
St. Louis Alumni Chapter
Springfield Alumni Chapter

Montana
Billings Alumni Chapter    
Bozeman Alumni    
Missoula Alumni Chapter

Nebraska
Omaha Alumni Chapter
Greater Nebraska Alumni Chapter

Nevada
Northern Nevada Alumni Chapter    
Southern Nevada Alumni Chapter

New Jersey
Northern New Jersey Alumni Chapter

New Mexico
Albuquerque Alumni Chapter

New York
Central New York Alumni Association     
New York City Alumni Chapter    
Rochester Alumni Chapter

North Carolina 
Asheville Alumni Chapter
Charlotte Alumni Chapter    
Raleigh Alumni Chapter    
Upstate S.C. Alumni Chapter

North Dakota
Grand Forks Alumni Chapter

Ohio
Akron Alumni Chapter    
Central Ohio Alumni Chapter     
Cleveland Alumni Chapter
Cincinnati Alumni Chapter    
Dayton Area Alumni Chapter
Toledo Area Alumni Association
Youngstown Alumni Chapter

Oklahoma
Bartlesville Alumni Chapter    
Cleveland County Alumni Association    
Enid Alumni Chapter    
Oklahoma City Alumni Chapter   
Stillwater Alumni Chapter    
Tulsa Alumni Chapter

Oregon
Portland Alumni Chapter

Pennsylvania
Harrisburg Alumni Chapter    
Philadelphia Alumni Chapter  
Pittsburgh Alumni Chapter    
State College Alumni Chapter

Rhode Island
Narragansett Bay Alumni Chapter    
Providence Alumni Chapter

South Carolina
Charleston S.C. Alumni Chapter    
Columbia Alumni Chapter
Hilton Head Alumni Chapter

Tennessee
Chattanooga Alumni Chapter    
Clarksville Alumni Chapter: https://www.asigiam.com
Memphis Area Alumni Chapter    
Nashville Alumni Chapter    
Stones River Alumni Chapter

Texas
Austin Alumni Chapter    
Central Texas Alumni Chapter    
Collin County Alumni Chapter    
Corpus Christi Alumni Chapter    
Dallas Alumni Chapter    
Fort Worth Alumni Chapter
Houston Alumni Chapter 
Lubbock Alumni Chapter   
Mid Cities Alumni Chapter    
Midland Texas Alumni Chapter    
North Texas Alumni Chapter    
San Antonio Alumni Chapter
The Woodlands, Texas Alumni Chapter

Utah
Salt Lake City Alumni Chapter

Virginia
 Central Virginia Alumni (Richmond)
Chesapeake Bay Alumni Chapter
Northern Virginia Alumni Chapter

Washington
Elliott Bay Alumni Chapter    
Seattle Alumni Chapter    
Tacoma Alumni Chapter

West Virginia
Charleston, WV Alumni Chapter    
Parkersburg Alumni Chapter

Wisconsin
Milwaukee Alumni Chapter

Wyoming
Cheyenne Alumni Chapter

Alumni Chapters in Canada

British Columbia
Vancouver Alumni Chapter

Nova Scotia
Halifax Alumni Chapter

Ontario
Ottawa Alumni Chapter
Toronto Alumni Chapter
Windsor Alumni Chapter

Quebec
Montreal Alumni Chapter

Alumni Chapters in the United Kingdom
London "European" Alumni Association

See also
 The Magazine of Sigma Chi

References

External links

Lists of chapters of United States student societies by society
alumni chapters